Luiz Ferreira Nesi (born 15 November 1902, date of death unknown), known as just Nesi, was a Brazilian footballer. He played in eight matches for the Brazil national football team in 1922 and 1923. He was also part of Brazil's squad for the 1922 South American Championship.

References

External links
 

1902 births
Year of death missing
Brazilian footballers
Brazil international footballers
Place of birth missing
Association footballers not categorized by position